The Boston mayoral election of 1929 occurred on Tuesday, November 5, 1929. Former Mayor of Boston James Michael Curley defeated two other candidates to be elected mayor for the third time.

In 1918, the Massachusetts state legislature had passed legislation making the Mayor of Boston ineligible to serve consecutive terms. Thus, incumbent Malcolm Nichols was unable to run for re-election.

Curley was sworn on Monday, January 6, 1930.

Candidates
Daniel H. Coakley, disbarred attorney, unsuccessful candidate for Mayor of Boston in November 1925.
James Michael Curley, member of the United States House of Representatives from 1913 to 1914, Mayor of Boston from 1914 to 1918, 1922 to 1926.
Frederick Mansfield, Treasurer and Receiver-General of Massachusetts from 1914 to 1915.

Results

See also
List of mayors of Boston, Massachusetts

References

Further reading
 

Boston mayoral
Boston
1929
Non-partisan elections
1920s in Boston